Little County Court (German: Kleines Bezirksgericht) is a 1938 German comedy film directed by Alwin Elling and starring Hans Moser,  Ida Wüst and Lucie Englisch.  It was shot at the Halensee Studios in Berlin. The film's sets were designed by the art directors Gabriel Pellon and Heinrich Richter.

Synopsis
An overenthusiastic clerk working in a district court in a suburb of Vienna gives out free legal advice and is friends with Amanda Hopfstangl. However he finds himself embroiled in a legal case in which she is one of the parties.

Cast
 Hans Moser as Karl Haselhuber
 Ida Wüst as Elisabeth Pieringer
 Lucie Englisch as 	Amanda Hopfstangl
 Gusti Wolf as Mizzi, Pieringers Nichte
 Eduard Wesener as Willi Hickel 
 Paul Otto as 	Der Bezirksrichter
 Erich Fiedler as 	Dr. Schartenreiter
 Rudolf Carl as 	Strassenmusikant Postl
 Fritz Imhoff as 	Strassenmusikant Blaschek
 Karl Hellmer as 	Brandler
 Jochen Hauer as Gustav Berger

References

Bibliography 
 Klaus, Ulrich J. Deutsche Tonfilme: Jahrgang 1938. Klaus-Archiv, 1988.
 Niven, Bill, Hitler and Film: The Führer's Hidden Passion. Yale University Press, 2018.
 Waldman, Harry. Nazi Films In America, 1933-1942. McFarland & Co, 2008.

External links 
 

1938 films
Films of Nazi Germany
1930s German-language films
Films directed by Alwin Elling
1930s German films
German comedy films
1938 comedy films
Films set in Vienna
Films shot at Halensee Studios
German films based on plays

de:Kleines Bezirksgericht